Lower Definition is an American post-hardcore band from San Diego, California, United States, formed in 2002. The band released two studio albums and six EPs before disbanding in 2009. After that they released an EP in 2011 called 'The Infinite Et Cetera'. In 2020 the band reunited and has since released 4 songs.

History

2002-2009
Lower Definition was formed in 2002 by Eddy Marshburn and Valentino Arteaga. Marshburn's sister introduced the two and they began rehearsing, soon connecting with other musicians. The band started out playing in the all-ages scene of San Diego.

The band, still unsigned, won a slot on the Taste of Chaos tour at the San Diego Sports Arena in 2006 resulting from a contest held by MySpace. Their demo song "Higher Than Kites" features Vic Fuentes of Pierce The Veil. At Mira Mesa's Epicentre a month later, lead singer Jordan Wark surprised fans and his four bandmates when he announced onstage that he'd be leaving the band. Matt Geise came from the band The Red Sky to replace Wark on vocals. In 2007, they independently released their debut album, Moths featuring Geise for the first time as their vocalist on an any recording.

In 2008, they released The Greatest of All Lost Arts on Ferret Records, featuring guest vocals from Jonny Craig. The band went on the Party Star Tour with Dance Gavin Dance and A Static Lullaby to promote its release. Arteaga and bassist Stefan Toler quit the band in February, 2009 causing the band to suffer their first hiatus.

2009-2011
The band re-formed when Matt Geise and Eddy Marshburn put together a new lineup in late 2009 with Willie Caldwell, Korey Severson, and Michael McCullough. The band started recording with Chad Ackerman (formerly of Destroy the Runner) and posted demos to their Myspace. Since the band's reformation they went on the  No Bummer Summer Tour with Gwen Stacy and the Mac N Dank Tour with Conditions. They also toured with Jamie's Elsewhere. They finished recording their new EP entitled "The Infinite Et Cetera", available at their bandcamp website.

Matt Geise has said from several of his Twitter updates that he was no longer lead singer for the band. Since then, Lower Definition has gone in a state of Inactivity. In 2016, Geise released a 3-song EP under the moniker Low End Talk.

2018-Present: 10 Year Reunion Show and New Album
In October 2018, after an extended period of inactivity, the band announced a reunion show in honor of the ten year anniversary of their album The Greatest of All Lost Arts. Initially slated to perform the side stage at San Diego's SOMA venue on December 14, rapid ticket sales quickly escalated them to the main stage. Shortly after, they announced the show would be supported by Night Verses and Dead American. The current lineup for the reunion show features Matt Geise, Eddy Marshburn, Valentino Arteaga, Stefan Toler, and Mark Luciano.
In 2020 Lower Definition got back together and is working on a new album which will be released 2021. On April 2 the band released a single from their upcoming album entitled "Grief Eater".

Band members

Current lineup
Matt Geise – lead vocals (2007–2011, 2020–present) 
Eddy Marshburn – lead guitar (2002–2011, 2020–present) 
Stefan Toler – bass (2002–2009, 2020–present) 
Valentino Arteaga  – drums  (2002–2009, 2020–present) 
Mark Luciano - rhythm guitar (2004-2008, 2020–present) 

Former members
 Esteban Baena – vocals (2002–2004)
 Jordan Wark – vocals (2005–2007)
Willie Caldwell – rhythm guitar (2009–2011)
 Michael McCullough – bass (2009–2011)
 Forrest Holland – drums (2002–2003)
 Kerry Carter – bass guitar, vocals (2002–2004) 
 Korey Severson – drums (2009–2011)

Discography

EPs & Demos
Upon Fallen Ashes (Self-released, 2003)
Early 2004 Demo (Self-released, 2004)
Winter Tour 2004–2005 Sample (Self-released, 2004–2005)
Rough EP (Self-released, 2005)
Demo 2005 (Self-released, 2005)
Fall 2006 Demo (Self-released, 2006)*
The Infinite Et Cetera (Self-released, 2011)

Studio albums
Moths (Self-released, 2007)
The Greatest of All Lost Arts (Ferret Records, July 8, 2008)

References

American post-hardcore musical groups
Musical groups established in 2002
Musical groups disestablished in 2009
Musical groups reestablished in 2020
Musical quintets
Musical groups from San Diego
2002 establishments in California
Ferret Music artists